is a railway station in Toyotomi, Teshio District, Hokkaidō, Japan. Only local trains serve this station.

Lines
Hokkaido Railway Company
Sōya Main Line Station W76

Layout
Two track loop with two side platforms.

Gallery

Adjacent stations

References

Stations of Hokkaido Railway Company
Railway stations in Hokkaido Prefecture
Railway stations in Japan opened in 1924